Anderson da Silva Gibin (born 21 July 1979), sometimes known as Anderson PB, is a Brazilian footballer who plays for Clube Náutico Marcílio Dias.

Biography
In January 2005 he left for Itumbiara for Campeonato Goiano. On 28 March 2005 he left for Araguaína. In August 2005 he was signed by Goianésia. On 1 March 2006 he returned to Araguaína and he contract was extended to December 2007 in January 2007. In September 2007 he left for Paysandu, signed a 1-year contract. The club was eliminated from 2007 Campeonato Brasileiro Série C in August and was preparing for Copa do Centenário do Campeonato Paraense and for 2008 Campeonato Paraense. He was released before the start of 2008 Campeonato Brasileiro Série C.

In January 2010 he left for Corinthians Alagoano, and immediately made his debut in round 5 of Campeonato Alagoano, ahead Wagner and Marcos. In May 2010 he left for city rival CSA, and ahead Jéferson as first choice in 2010 Campeonato Brasileiro Série D and 2010 Campeonato Alagoano Segunda Divisão. He played 4 out of 5 State League Group stage matches. He also played at 2010 Campeonato do Nordeste.

In December 2010 he signed a new contract which last until the end of 2011 Campeonato Alagoano.

Career statistics

12005 Campeonato Goiano statistics unknown
22005 Campeonato Tocantinense statistics unknown
32005 Campeonato Goiano Segunda Divisão statistics unknown
42006 Campeonato Tocantinense statistics unknown
52007 Campeonato Tocantinense statistics unknown
6Copa do Centenário do Campeonato Paraense statistics unknown
72008 Campeonato Paraense statistics unknown
82008 Campeonato Goiano Terceira Divisão statistics unknown
92009 Campeonato Goiano statistics unknown
102009 Campeonato Goiano Segunda Divisão statistics unknown
112009 Campeonato Tocantinense Segunda Divisão statistics unknown
12Include 16 matches at 2010 Campeonato Alagoano.
13Include 4 matches at 2010 Campeonato Alagoano Segunda Divisão and 12 matches at 2010 Campeonato do Nordeste.

Honours
Champion
Campeonato Tocantinense: 2006, 2009 (Araguaína)
Campeonato Tocantinense Segunda Divisão: 2009
Campeonato Alagoano Segunda Divisão: 2010
Runner-up
Campeonato Tocantinense: 2005, 2007 (Araguaína)
Campeonato Goiano Terceira Divisão: 2008

References

External links
 CBF 
 Futpedia 
 

Brazilian footballers
Itumbiara Esporte Clube players
Paysandu Sport Club players
Sport Club Corinthians Alagoano players
Centro Sportivo Alagoano players
Clube Náutico Marcílio Dias players
Association football goalkeepers
Footballers from São Paulo
1979 births
Living people
Araguaína Futebol e Regatas players